was a feudal domain in Edo period Japan, located in Dewa Province (modern-day Akita Prefecture), Japan. It was governed for the whole of its history by the Satake clan. During its rule over Kubota, the Satake clan was ranked as a  family, and as such, had the privilege of shogunal audiences in the Great Hall (Ohiroma) of Edo Castle.

In the Boshin War of 1868–69, the domain joined the Ōuetsu Reppan Dōmei, the alliance of northern domains supporting the Tokugawa shogunate, but then later defected to the imperial side. As with all other domains, it was disbanded in 1871.

History

The Satake clan was a powerful samurai clan, who ruled Hitachi Province from the late Heian period through the end of the Sengoku period. In 1600, the Satake sided with the pro-Toyotomi cause at the Battle of Sekigahara. After the defeat of the pro-Toyotomi forces by Tokugawa Ieyasu and the establishment of the Tokugawa shogunate, the Satake clan was punished by a severe reduction in its kokudaka.  and by being ordered to relocate from their ancestral territories in Hitachi Province to a much smaller fief in inhospitable northern Japan. As a result of this drop in income (to 205,000 koku, or less than half of their previous kokudaka of around 540,000 koku), the Satake had to lay off many retainers, and institute a general stipend reduction for those it kept.

The domain also struggled through agricultural crises, which resulted in several peasant uprisings throughout the course of its history.

The domain had a population of 56,813 people per the 1730 census. It maintained its primary residence (kamiyashiki) in Edo at Uchi-Kanda Asahi-cho until a fire in 1682, after which the residence was moved to Shichigen-cho in Shitaya. The domain’s secondary residence (shimoyashiki) was in Fukagawa (later moved to Sakumachō), and its tertiary residences (nakayashiki) in Torigoe, Honjo and Nippori.

Satake Yoshiatsu (better known by his nom-de-plume "Satake Shozan"), the 8th generation lord of Kubota, was an accomplished artist. Yoshiatsu painted a number of paintings in the Dutch style, and also produced three treatises on European painting techniques, including the depiction of perspective. He was also a student of Dutch studies (rangaku) scholar Hiraga Gennai, who he had invited up to Akita to advise him on management of the domain's copper mines.

Kubota Domain was uncommon in that it contained more than one castle, and was an exception to the Tokugawa shogunate's "one castle per domain" rule. The main castle was Kubota Castle, but there were also castles at Yokote and Ōdate, and five fortified estates elsewhere in the domain: Kakunodate, Yuzawa, Hiyama, Jūniso, and In'nai. Each of these was given to a senior retainer who ran it as his own small castle town. The senior retainers had personal retainers who resided in these castle towns.

Kubota Domain had two sub-domains: Iwasaki (20,000 koku) and the short-lived Kubota-shinden (10,000 koku).

Two of the clan elder (karō) families serving the Kubota domain were branches of the Satake family. One was the North Satake (Satake-hokke) family, stipended at 10,000 koku; the other the West Satake (Satake-nishi ke) family, stipended at 7200 koku. The North Satake family had its landholdings around Kakunodate, one of the fortified estates mentioned above; the West Satake resided in and had their landholdings around Ōdate. Yokote Castle was in the care of another hereditary karō family, the Tomura. Norihisa Satake, the current mayor of the city of Akita, is a descendant of the North Satake.

During the Boshin War of 1868–69, the Satake clan was a signatory to the pact that formed the Ōuetsu Reppan Dōmei, the alliance of northern domains led by the Sendai Domain. The Satake clan's delegation at Shiroishi, the alliance's headquarters, was led by the clan elder (karō) Tomura Yoshiari. However, the Satake had political difficulties with the alliance, which culminated in the murder, in Akita, of a delegation from Sendai on August 21, 1868, and the display of the messengers' gibbeted heads in the Akita castle town. The delegation, led by Shimo Matazaemon, was dispatched to request the Akita domain to hand over Kujō Michitaka and other officials of an imperial delegation that had been originally sent to the region to gather support for the imperial cause. The Satake then backed out of the alliance and supported the imperial army; eleven days later, on September 1, 1868 the Tsugaru clan of the neighboring Hirosaki Domain followed suit. In response, the pro-alliance domains of Morioka and Ichinoseki Domains sent troops to attack Kubota. Kubota forces were hard-pressed to defend their territory, with the result that the alliance troops had made serious advances by the time the war ended in northern Honshū. In early 1869, Satake Yoshitaka formally gave up the domain's registers to the imperial government, and was made imperial governor of Kubota (han chiji). In mid-1869, the imperial government rewarded its service in the Boshin War with an increase in kokudaka of 20,000 koku. However, with the abolition of the han system in 1871, the former domain was absorbed into the new Akita Prefecture and Satake Yoshitaka was ordered to relocate to Tokyo. He subsequently received the kazoku peerage title of koshaku (marquis).

Holdings at the end of the Edo period
As with most domains in the han system, Kubota Domain consisted of several discontinuous territories calculated to provide the assigned kokudaka, based on periodic cadastral surveys and projected agricultural yields.

Dewa Province
286 villages in Akita District
59 villages in Kawabe District
181 villages in Senboku District
115 villages in Hiraka District
59 villages in Yamamoto District
55 villages in Ogachi District
Shimotsuke Province
3 villages in Tsuga District
8 villages in Kawachi District
Teshio Province, Ezo
 1 trading post in Mashike District
Kitami Province, Ezo
 1 trading post in Rishiri District
 1 trading post in Rebun District
 most of Soya District

List of Daimyō
  Satake clan (tozama) 1602-1871

Genealogy (simplified)

Satake Yoshishige, 18th head of the Satake clan (1547-1612)
 I. Yoshinobu, 1st daimyō of Kubota (cr. 1602) (1570-1633; r. 1602-1633)
Iwaki Sadataka, Lord of Shinano-Nakamura (1583-1620)
 II. Satake Yoshitaka, 2nd daimyō  of Kubota (1609-1672; r. 1633-1672)
Yoshioki (1633-1665)
 Yoshikuni, 1st daimyō  of Kubota-Shinden (1665-1725)
 Yoshikata, 2nd daimyō  of Kubota-Shinden (1692-1742)
  VI. Yoshimasa, 6th daimyō  of Kubota (1728-1753; r. 1749-1753)
 III. Yoshizumi, 3rd daimyō  of Kubota (1637-1703; r. 1672-1703)
 IV. Yoshitada, 4th daimyō  of Kubota (1695-1715; r. 1703-1715)
 Sōma Nobutane, 6th daimyō  of Sōma-Nakamura (1677-1711)
 Sōma Noritane (1702-1752) 
 Sōma Morotane, 8th daimyō  of Sōma-Nakamura (1734-1791)
 Sōma Yoshitane, 9th daimyō  of Sōma-Nakamura (1765-1813)
 Sōma Masutane, 11th daimyō  of Sōma-Nakamura (1796-1845)
Sōma Mitsutane, 12th daimyō  of Sōma-Nakamura (1819-1887)
 Satake Yoshisato, 9th daimyō  of Iwasaki, 1st Viscount (1858-1914)
 Yoshitatsu, 2nd Baron, head of the Iwasaki branch (1885-1935; Baron: 1893-1929)
 Yoshiaki, head of the Iwasaki branch (1919-1976)
 Yoshitomo, head of the Iwasaki branch (b. 1951)
 Asanashi (b. 1986)
 XII. Satake Yoshitaka II, 12th daimyō  of Kubota, 1st Marquess (1825-1884; Lord: 1857-1868; Governor: 1869-1871; 30th family head: 1857-1872; 32nd family head: 1881-1884;  Marquess: cr. 1884)
 Yoshinari, 33rd family head, 2nd Marquess (1867-1915; 33rd family head and 2nd Marquess: 1884-1915)
 Yoshiharu, 34th family head, 3rd Marquess (1890-1944; 34th family head and 3rd Marquess: 1915-1944)
 Yoshihide, 35th family head, 4th Marquess (1914-1983; 35th family head: 1944-1983; 4th Marquess: 1944-1947), m. Tokugawa Yuriko (b. 1917), dau. of Tokugawa Yoshichika, 1st Marquess (1886-1976), and brother of Ogiu (Matsudaira) Yoshitatsu, 3rd Count (b. 1916). He adopted his nephew, the son of Ogiu Yoshitatsu:
 Satake (Ogiu) Takashi, 36th family head (b. 1947; 36th family head: 1983-present)
Motohiro (b. 1981)
 Akihiro (b. 1982)
 Satake Yoshimatsu, 8th daimyō of Iwasaki (1837-1870)
 Yoshinao, 31st family head, 1st Baron (1854-1893; 31st family head: 1872-1881; Baron: 1889)
 Yoshinaga, 1st daimyō of Iwasaki (1655-1741)
  V. Yoshimine, 5th daimyō of Kubota (1690-1749; r. 1715-1749) 
 A daughter, m. Takakura Nagayoshi (1592-1664)
 Satake Yoshichika (1619-1702)
 Yoshihide (1645-1721)
 Yoshimoto (1675-1752)
 Yoshimichi, 2nd daimyō of Iwasaki (1701-1765)
  VII. Yoshiharu, 7th daimyō of Kubota (1723-1758; r. 1753-1758) 
  VIII. Yoshiatsu, 8th daimyō of Kubota (1748-1785; r. 1758-1785)
  IX. Yoshimasa, 9th daimyō of Kubota (1775-1815; r. 1785-1815) 
  X. Yoshihiro, 10th daimyō of Kubota (1812-1846; r. 1815-1846)
  XI. Yoshichika, 11th daimyō of Kubota (1839-1857; r. 1846-1857)

Subsidiary domains

Iwasaki Domain
He built a jin'ya in what is now Yuzawa, Akita, where his descendants continued to rule until the Meiji restoration. The domain was unusual in that it did not directly control any territory, but was assigned revenues from the general revenues of the parent domain. The daimyō of Iwasaki Domain participated in the sankin kotai system, and used Kubota Domain’s tertiary residence in Edo, located in Torigoe.

  Satake clan (tozama) 1701-1871

Kubota Shinden Domain
 was founded in 1701 for Satake Yoshikune, the grandson of Satake Yoshitaka, the 2nd daimyō of Kubota Domain. Satake Yoshizumi, the 3rd daimyō of Kubota domain assigned him 10,000 koku, which he ruled as a subsidiary domain of Kubota Domain until his retirement in 1720.  He was succeeded by Satake Yoshikata, who ruled until May 1732. He was adopted by Satake Yoshimine, the 5th daimyo of Kubota Domain to be his heir, and Kubota Shinden Domain was absorbed back into Kubota Domain.

  Satake clan (tozama) 1602-1871

Notes

References 
French, Calvin L., et al. (1978). Through Closed Doors: Western Influence on Japanese Art 1639-1853. Rochester, Michigan: Oakland University.
Hoshi, Ryōichi (1997). Ōuetsu Reppandōmei. Tokyo: Chūōkōron-shinsha.
Karino, Tokuzō (1910). Satake-ke rekidai jiryaku 佐竹家歴代事略. Akita: Karino Sadakichi. (Accessed from National Diet Library, 17 August 2008)
McClellan, Edwin (1985). Woman in the Crested Kimono. New Haven: Yale University Press.
Naramoto, Tatsuya (1992). Nihon no kassen: monoshiri jiten. Tokyo: Shufu-to-seikatsusha.
 Onodera, Eikō (2005). Boshin nanboku sensō to Tohoku seiken. Sendai: Kita no mori.

 Saga, Jun'ichi (1987). Memories of Silk and Straw: A Self-Portrait of Small-Town Japan. New York: Kodansha International.
 Sasaki, Suguru (2002). Boshin Senso: haisha no Meiji-ishin. Tokyo: Chuōkōron-shinsha.
Yamakawa Kenjirō (1933). Aizu Boshin senshi. Tokyo: Tokyo Daigaku shuppankai.
Zusetsu: Nihon meijō-shū (2003). Tokyo: Gakken.

External links
"Akita ranga" on Japanese Architecture and Art Net Users System. Accessed 19 August 2008.
 "Kubota-han" on Edo 300 HTML (accessed 15 August 2008)
List of Meiji-era Japanese nobility (accessed 17 August 2008)

Domains of Japan
States and territories established in 1602
1602 establishments in Japan
1871 disestablishments in Japan
States and territories disestablished in 1871
Dewa Province
History of Akita Prefecture
Ōuetsu Reppan Dōmei
Satake clan